Sabah Tshung Tsin Secondary School (Sekolah Menengah Tshung Tsin Sabah in Malay, 沙巴崇正中学 in Chinese) is a Chinese independent high school located in Kota Kinabalu, Sabah, Malaysia. The school is one of sixty-one Chinese Independent High Schools in Malaysia. In 2007, the school was chosen as one of the ten Chinese Independent High Schools in Malaysia to be included as a Cluster School under the Education Blueprint of the Malaysian Government's Ninth Malaysia Plan.

History

1962–1965: Early history
In 1962, the Malaysian government brought in legislation that only students who excelled in their Ujian Pencapaian Sekolah Rendah (Primary School Leaving Examination) and were under the age of thirteen were eligible for education in secondary school. As a result, at least 40-50% of students in the city were unable to further their studies, the majority of whom were Chinese. The Chinese community consequently opened Tshung Tsin school to solve this problem. It was founded by the Api-Api Hakka Association in 1965. Datuk Chong Fook Thien, then-President of the Hakka Association and one of the school's founders, proposed the construction of its building.

A committee was started with Datuk Pang Tet Chung as its chairperson. At the first meeting on 6 January 1965, the name "Sabah Tshung Tsin Secondary School" was decided. The federal Financial Department approved the exemption of income tax to those who funded the school. On 12 October 1965, the school obtained the title deed for the land and the construction of the school commenced.

Sabah Tshung Tsin Secondary School opened on 25 January 1965, borrowing classrooms of the Chung Hwa School, Kota Kinabalu. 78 students were enrolled as the school's first students. The school was consequently accepted as a member of the Chinese Independent High School in Malaysia.

1966–1989: Development and growth

In 1967, the first permanent school building was opened by the then Chief Minister of Sabah, Tun Datu Mustapha. Around 670 students enrolled in the school. In 1968, the government implemented a higher graduation rate for primary school students whereby students can then easily enroll into public secondary schools. This significantly reduced the enrolment rate for independent schools throughout Malaysia. By 1974 there were only 24 students left in the school, and the school was at risk of being closed.

The Api-Api Hakka Association decided to take action and had appointed a new management for the school. A new principal, Mr. Chang Yu On, was appointed in November 1974. Some professional Chinese teachers were also invited to teach in the school. The Hakka Association's efforts bore fruit in 1975 as the enrolment rate went up to 250 students for Junior One (初中), with 60 students for the Senior section (高中).

In 1975, the school started classes for Senior 3 students, and for the first time participated in the government's Sijil Pelajaran Malaysia (SPM, Malaysian Education Certificate). Another 600 students were enrolled in the Junior section in 1976. Subsequently, the administrators decided to conduct an entrance examination to accept only the best students.

The Hakka Association tried to implement improvements for the school, independent of the Government because of the discrimination against Chinese High Schools due to the New Economic Policy, an affirmative policy which was introduced by the Malaysian Federal Government in 1971 favouring the bumiputras. By the 1980s improvements had been made, and this included the construction of more school buildings. The new buildings included two permanent classroom buildings, a building for the school administrators, a garden inside the two new classroom buildings and the new school administrators building, a hall with a capacity of around 1000 students, a multi-purpose field, two basketball courts and a volleyball court.

On 19 August 1982, a new five story building was opened, which provided a canteen on the ground floor, a computer lab on the second floor, and a library on the third and fourth floors. The fifth floor was used to provide accommodation for teachers for two years until a new teacher's hostel was opened in 1986.

In 1984, as results for the students taking the Unified Examinations Certificate (UEC) were encouraging, the school decided to have classes for qualified students who were planning to further their studies in universities. A building was planned to be built in Menggatal, Sabah, but the school lost the land the new building was to be built on due to the defeat of the ruling party Barisan Nasional by the Parti Bersatu Sabah in the 1985 Sabah state election. In the end, the empty fifth floor of the five-story building was used instead for classes. Classes started in January 1987 with 152 students. The Pre-University class concept was well received and method of teaching was also lauded. In the same year, students who went for the A-Level and LCCI examinations organised by the University of Cambridge achieved good results, and this prompted the Hakka Association to raise funds to construct a building exclusively for the Pre-University students. In 1989, the building was opened by the then Chief Minister of Sabah, Datuk Pairin Kitingan. The Pre-University was known then as "Sabah Tshung Tsin Pre-University Centre" and today it is known as Institut Sinaran.

1989–today
The school's principal Chang Yu On died on 4 November 1989 of a heart attack at age 48. In 1991, the Yang di-Pertua Negeri of Sabah bestowed the honorary title "Datuk" to Chang Yu On posthumously to honour his contributions. The new principal was the then vice-principal Mr. Lau Suan Hok. In March 1990, Tsen Kui On and Hiew Hoh Shin were chosen as vice-principals of the school.

During the tenure of Lau Suan Hok, air-conditioning was installed in classrooms and the library was expanded. Lau retired in 1996 and Tsen Kui On became principal.

A seven-storey Co-curricular Activity Building was opened in December 1994. The canteen was moved to this building from the original five storey building, and two computer labs were added. The co-curricular activity offices were situated on the third floor. Music rooms, orchestral rehearsal facilities and photographic studios were also placed in this building.

In 2005, the school forged sister school relationships with Lee Kau Yan Memorial School, Hong Kong and DongHwa High School, South Korea. The school also has forged relationships with secondary schools from foreign countries, such as Lee Kau Yan Memorial School & Yan Chai Hospital Wong Wha San Secondary School in Hong Kong.

Due to the increase in enrolments, the Hakka Association proposed to build a new school campus in Menggatal. In 1998, the then Chief Minister of Sabah, Datuk Yong Teck Lee, approved a permit and a land title was received. Approximately  of land was granted to the Hakka Association. The building planned is costly, and fund-raising is continuing. Phase 1 of the school's new campus is planned to be completed by early 2009.

In 2008, Mr. Tsen retired as the principal of the school. As a result, Mr. Hiew was appointed as Acting Principal, and in 2009, Principal.

In April 2017, a Rubber Running Track around the school football field was completed, making future Sports Days' Running events better by providing extra traction. In the same year, the school announced its plan to build a new 3-storey building in the middle of the garden in between the two classroom buildings and the school administrators' building. The new building, named TreeCube, has a recreational area on the ground floor and individual lockers for students. The second, third and fourth floors are offices for teachers, with the old staffrooms in the classrooms building becoming future classrooms for students. The building was completed by the end of 2017, just in time for the 2018 school year. A plea to the government was also applied for the Junior 3 students to be able to take Mathematics and Science in English for the compulsory public PT3 examination, as Mathematics and Science are usually taken with Bahasa Melayu as the official language. In July 2017, the plea was approved, with Junior 3 students able to take Mathematics and Science in English for PT3 starting from 2019.

Fees
The school fees ranges from RM4,017 to RM5,215 per annum depending on which year the students are in. It does not include insurance, sports fees and the cost of living skill classes. Students who cannot afford the school fees can apply for financial assistance.

Scholarships are available for pupils who score an overall A1 in the entrance examination, or those who achieve 7As in Ujian Penilaian Sekolah Rendah examination with an A2 in the entrance examination. Staff's children also benefit from reduced fees. The scholarship covers the fees for three years in the Junior section. Students that qualify for the financial help only pay between RM770 to RM825 annually. No scholarships are available for students in the Senior section.

School fees in secondary schools run by the government in Malaysia are either free or the students are only charged a minimal amount. Due to the vast difference in fees between private and government-run schools (e.g. students attending Tshung Tsin pays approximately RM2000 a year in fees while students in government schools only around RM20 a year).
...

Achievements
The school has achieved a pass rate of 100% for both public examinations, SPM and PMR since 2001.

Beside SPM and PMR, students at Tshung Tsin have to sit for the Chinese Independent Schools' Unified Examination Certificate (UEC) examination. In the 2006 result, Tshung Tsin had an overall pass rate of 96.17% in the senior section.

A student of the school also won the Grand Prize of the 4th Japanese Speech Contest for Secondary School organised by The Japan Club of Kuala Lumpur, the Japanese Chamber of Trade & Industry Malaysia (JACTIM), the Embassy of Japan in Malaysia and the Japan Foundation Kuala Lumpur (JFKL).

Facilities
The school consists of three buildings for classrooms, two buildings as teachers' hostel, a fully air-conditioned hall (兆龙堂), a seven floor multi-purpose co-curriculum building, a 3 floor office building (TreeCube), four workshops for Living Skills, parking lots, a football field, two basketball courts and a volleyball court.

Co-curriculum building

The building has seven levels and is the tallest of all the school buildings. The ground floor and second floor are both parts of the school canteen. There is a stationery shop on the second floor. Computer Lab B and the Multimedia Room are both located on the second floor as well. The co-curriculum department office is located on the third floor of the building. From the third floor onwards, there are over 25 co-curricular activity rooms such as the Cultural Orchestra practice room, the Dance Club Room, the Knitting Club Room, a Music Room (equipped with a standing piano, a few guitars, a television, a mini PA system and a radio set), and several other special classrooms etc. The 7th floor is an open space and is multi-purpose, usually used for Physical Education classes and by the Fencing Club. A surau for Muslim students is also located in this building.

Classroom buildings
The building has over 50 classrooms (44 main classrooms, a special room and four extra classrooms) which are all air-conditioned. There are also five science laboratories (Junior Science Lab A & B, Physics Lab, Biology Lab and Chemistry Lab) and a computer laboratory. The building also houses the Teachers' Office, an Education Department Office, the Principal and Vice Principal's office, the Secretary's office, the General Affairs Department, the Administration Department, a Meeting room, the Financial Department, the Health office, the Teachers' and Students' Welfare Department, the Counseling Department, the Disciplinary Department, the Prefect Board and the Computer Lab. The double-storey, air-conditioned library is located above the Teachers' Offices. A photocopy shop can be found on the ground floor.

Gardens and kiosks
The Yo An Court (佑安苑) is located next to the broadcasting room. The garden is named after the late principal, Datuk Chang Yu On. The westernmost part of the school compound is the herb garden. Inside the garden there are benches and tables for relaxation or a game of Chinese chess.  There are three pavilions located in different parts of the school. These pavilions are named Jing Si Ting (静思亭), Si Yuan Ting (思源亭) and Tshung Tsin Pavilion (崇正亭).

References

External links
 Official website

Buildings and structures in Kota Kinabalu
Educational institutions established in 1965
Secondary schools in Malaysia
Schools in Sabah
Chinese-language schools in Malaysia
1965 establishments in Malaysia